Osmylidae are a small family of winged insects of the net-winged insect order Neuroptera. The osmylids, also called lance lacewings, stream lacewings or giant lacewings, are found all over the world. There are around 225 extant species.

Description and ecology
Adult osmylids are small to moderately-sized net-winged insects, with wingspans ranging from 1.4 to 3 cm. Smaller members resemble typical green lacewings, and larger species resemble antlions. Many species, namely those of the type genus Osmylus, have spotted wings. The thin antennae are short. They have two compound eyes, as well as three ocelli in between. Adult osmylids, like green lacewings (some of which are colloquially known as "stinkflies"), have prothoracal glands which produce foul-smelling compounds used to deter would-be predators.

Their larvae are superficially similar to those of spongillaflies (Sisyridae). They have peculiar mouthparts which look like a thin forceps with the ends bending outwards. The body is elongated and slender and terminates in two extensible graspers bearing tiny hooks; these are used to aid in locomotion and to grasp prey. The larvae are associated with damp, mossy habitats and are amphibious. They hunt small invertebrate prey, from which they suck the body fluids with their mouthparts.

The adults are diurnal or crepuscular weak-flying insects which mostly prey on small invertebrates, supplemented with some pollen. Eggs are deposited in damp places, usually near freshwater.

Systematics and taxonomy
Osmylids are generally placed with the extant families Sisyridae (spongillaflies) and Nevrorthidae within the clade Osmyloidea, which is the second earliest diverging clade of Neuroptera after Coniopterygidae (dustywings). The group also contains Archeosmylidae from the Permian-Triassic and Saucrosmylidae from the Middle Jurassic, both of which are thought to be closely related to Osmylidae. The earliest records of Osmylidae date to the Early Jurassic, some of which are already assignable to extant subfamilies, and were diverse during the Jurassic and Cretaceous. At least 278 species have been described in 25 extant and 38 extinct genera.

Taxonomy largely after Winterton et al., 2019

Subfamilies and genera 
 Subfamily Eidoporisminae 
 Eidoporismus  - Australia
 †Stenosmylina  - Weald Clay, United Kingdom, Early Cretaceous (Hauterivian)
 Subfamily Gumillinae 
 Gumilla  - Brazil
 †Allotriosmylus  - Daohugou Bed, China, Middle Jurassic (Callovian)
 †Enodinympha  - Daohugou Bed, China, Middle Jurassic (Callovian)
 †Epiosmylus  - Daohugou Bed, China, Middle Jurassic (Callovian), Itat Formation, Russia, Middle Jurassic (Bathonian), Karabastau Formation, Kazakhstan, Middle/Late Jurassic
 †Kolbasinella  - Karabastau Formation, Kazakhstan, Middle/Late Jurassic
 †Nilionympha  - Daohugou Bed, China, Middle Jurassic (Callovian)
 †Nuddsia  - Crato Formation, Brazil, Early Cretaceous (Aptian) (=Burmaleon Myskowiak et al, 2016 Burmese amber, Myanmar, Late Cretaceous (Cenomanian))
 †Osmylochrysa  - Purbeck Group, England, Early Cretaceous (Berriasian)
 †Tenuosmylus  Daohugou Bed, China, Middle Jurassic (Callovian)
 Subfamily Kempyninae 
 Australysmus  - Australia
 Euosmylus  - New Zealand
 Kempynus  Australia, New Zealand, Argentina, Chile
 †Arbusella  - Karabastau Formation, Kazakhstan, Middle/Late Jurassic
 †Cretosmylus  - Zaza Formation, Russia, Early Cretaceous (Aptian)
 †Euporismites  Redbank Plains Formation, Australia, Eocene (Ypresian)
 †Jurakempynus  Daohugou Bed, China, Middle Jurassic (Callovian), Karabastau Formation, Kazakhstan, Middle/Late Jurassic, Shar-Teeg, Mongolia, Late Jurassic (Tithonian)
 †Kempynosmylus  Zaza Formation, Russia, Early Cretaceous (Aptian)
 †Ponomarenkius  - Daohugou Bed, China, Middle Jurassic (Callovian)
 †Sauktangida  - Kyrgyzstan, Early Jurassic (Toarcian)
 †Mirokempynus Ma et al. 2020 Daohugou Bed, China, Middle Jurassic (Callovian)
 †Subfamily Mesosmylininae 
 †Mesosmylina  Posidonia Shale, Green Series, Germany, Sagul Formation, Kyrgyzstan Early Jurassic (Toarcian) Zhargalant Formation, Mongolia, Itat Formation, Russia, Middle Jurassic (Bathonian), Ukurei Formation, Russia, Late Jurassic (Tithonian)
 †Sogjuta  Dzhil Formation, Kyrgyzstan, Early Jurassic (Hettangian), Shar-Teeg, Mongolia, Late Jurassic (Tithonian)
 Subfamily Osmylinae 
 Grandosmylus  - Afghanistan, Tajikistan
 Lahulus  - India
 Osmylus  - Eurasia
 Parosmylus Needham, 1909 - Central through South Asia
 Sinosmylus  - China
 †Lithosmylus  - Florissant Formation, Colorado, United States, Eocene (Priabonian)
 †Vetosmylus  - Daohugou Bed, China, Middle Jurassic (Callovian)
 Subfamily Protosmylinae 
 Gryposmylus  - Central to Southeast Asia
 Heterosmylus  Central to South Asia
 Lysmus  - Indonesia, China, Japan, Russia
 Paryphosmylus  - Ecuador
 †Juraheterosmylus  - Daohugou Bed, China, Middle Jurassic (Callovian)
 †Jurosmylus  - Karabastau Formation, Kazakhstan, Middle/Late Jurassic
 †Mesosmylidus  - Purbeck Group, England, Early Cretaceous (Berriasian)
 †Osmylidia  - Florissant Formation, Colorado, United States, Eocene (Priabonian)
 †Petrushevskia  - Dzhil Formation, Kyrgyzstan, Early Jurassic (Hettangian)
 †Protosmylina  - Weald Clay, United Kingdom, Early Cretaceous (Barremian)
 †Protosmylus  - Baltic amber, Baltic Coast, Europe, Eocene
 †Pseudosmylidia  Florissant Formation, Colorado, United States, Eocene (Priabonian)
 Subfamily Stenosmylinae 
 Carinosmylus  - Australia
 Euporismus  - Australia
 Isostenosmylus  - Northern South America
 Oedosmylus  - Australia
 Phymatosmylus  - Argentina, Chile
 Stenolysmus  - Australia
 Stenosmylus  - Australia
 Subfamily Porisminae 
 Porismus  - Australia
 Subfamily Spilosmylinae 
 Spilosmylus  - Africa, South though Southeast Asia, New Guinea
 Thaumatosmylus  - Indonesia, Malaysia, China
 Thyridosmylus  Madagascar, China, India
 †Ensiosmylus  Karabastau Formation, Kazakhstan, Middle/Late Jurassic
 †Imanosmylus  Siyanovskaya Formation, Russia, Late Cretaceous (Maastrichtian)
 Subfamily Incertae sedis
 †Archaeosmylidia  - Daohugou Bed, China, Middle Jurassic (Callovian)
 †Dimidiosmylus  - Shar-Teeg, Mongolia, Late Jurassic (Tithonian)
 †Erlikosmylus  - Sagul Formation, Kyrgyzstan, Early Jurassic (Toarcian)
 †Karaosmylus  Karabastau Formation, Kazakhstan, Middle/Late Jurassic
 †Kubekius  - Itat Formation, Russia, Middle Jurassic (Bathonian)
 †Osmylopsis  - Purbeck Group, England, Early Cretaceous (Berriasian)
 †Palaeothyridosmylus  Daohugou Bed, China, Middle Jurassic (Callovian)
 †Pronymphites  - Karabastau Formation, Kazakhstan, Middle/Late Jurassic
 †Scapoptera  - Karabastau Formation, Kazakhstan, Middle/Late Jurassic
 †Stenochrysa  - Purbeck Group, England, Early Cretaceous (Berriasian)
 †Tengriosmylus  - Sagul Formation, Kyrgyzstan, Early Jurassic (Toarcian)
 †Tetanoptilon  - Posidonia Shale, Germany, Early Jurassic (Toarcian)

Notes

References

External links
This article draws heavily on the corresponding article in the German-language Wikipedia.

Neuroptera
Neuroptera families